The 1988-89 season, saw the Bracknell Bees compete in the English League First Division. It was the second season in the clubs history.

Results

English League First Division

English League Cup

References 

 

Bra
Sport in Bracknell